The Constitution of the Russian Federation was adopted by national referendum on 12 December 1993. Russia's constitution came into force on 25 December 1993, at the moment of its official publication, and abolished the Soviet system of government. The current Constitution is the second most long-lived in the history of Russia, behind the Constitution of 1936.

The text was drafted by the 1993 Constitutional Conference, which was attended by over 800 participants. Sergei Alexeyev, Sergey Shakhray, and sometimes Anatoly Sobchak are considered as the primary co-authors of the constitution. The text was inspired by Mikhail Speransky's constitutional project and the current French constitution. The USAID-funded lawyers also contributed to the development of the draft.

It replaced the previous Soviet-era Constitution of 12 April 1978, of the Russian Soviet Federative Socialist Republic (which had already been amended in April 1992 to reflect the dissolution of the Soviet Union and the sovereignty of the Russian Federation), following the 1993 Russian constitutional crisis.

Structure
The constitution is divided into two sections. Overall it creates a system of crown-presidentialism (see Partlett 2022 for details), which affords vast power to the office of the president to dominate executive, legislative, and judicial power.

Section One
Fundamentals of the Constitutional System
Rights and Liberties of Man and Citizen
Federative system
Judiciary
Local Self-Government

Section Two
Concluding and Transitional Provisions

Provisions
Especially on human rights and fundamental freedoms, the Constitution provides for human rights and freedoms of citizens according to the universally recognised principles and norms of international law as well as to their listing in the Constitution. (It affirms that the listing in the Constitution of the Russian Federation of the fundamental rights and freedoms shall not be interpreted as a rejection and derogation of other universally recognised human rights and freedoms.)

Executive

The Constitution of the Russian Federation specifies that the President is the Russian head of state, setting domestic and foreign policy and representing Russia both within the country and internationally [Article 80]. While the original constitution stipulated a four-year term and a maximum of two terms in succession, the current constitution decrees a six-year term. The four-year term was in effect while Vladimir Putin served his first and second terms; with the two-term limit, he was barred from the presidency in 2008. Instead, he served as Prime Minister while Dmitry Medvedev served as president for four years. Putin was re-elected to his third term in 2012; with the six-year term, he was elected to his fourth term in 2018. Article 81 specifies the method of election, including a secret ballot; Articles 82–93 detail powers, responsibilities, and limitations of the presidency. The constitution provides for a "strong presidency"; not only is the president the "Supreme Commander-in-Chief of the Armed Forces of the Russian Federation", the president also has the power to dissolve the State Duma.

Legislative branch

The legislature is the Federal Assembly of Russia, which consists of two chambers: the State Duma (the lower house) and the Federation Council (the upper house). The two chambers possess different powers and responsibilities: the State Duma is of more significance, as it carries the main responsibility for passing federal laws. Although a bill may originate in either legislative chamber (or be submitted by the President, government, local legislatures, Supreme Court, Constitutional Court, or High Arbitration Court), it must be first considered by the State Duma and be adopted by a majority vote before being turned over to the Federation Council, which has 14 days to take a vote on it. If the bill is adopted by the Federation Council, it must be signed by the President to become law. If rejected by the Federation Council, the bill will be returned to the State Duma, which can then override the council's rejection by passing it again with a two-thirds vote in the same form. The President has a final veto, but the State Duma and Federation Council also have an overriding power by passing with a two-thirds vote.

Judiciary

While the Russian Federation Constitution enumerates a strong and independent judicial branch, the reality is a question of debate. The constitution provides for judicial immunity, lifetime appointments/"irremovable" justices, the supremacy of the courts to administer justice, and affirms that judges need only submit to the constitution and the federal law. Additionally, Article 123 provides for open and fair trials, as well as equal application of the law. Three courts are delineated: Constitution Court of the Russian Federation, the Supreme Court of the Russian Federation, and the Higher Arbitration Court; each court is "appointed by the Council of the Federation upon the proposals by the President." The Constitution requires 19 judges for the Constitution Court, but does not specify the number of justices for the other courts. As of 2002, the Supreme Court has 115 members; due to the expansion of duties in 2014, the number of seats was increased to 170. In September 2014, the Institute of Modern Russia reported that the Russian Federation's Supreme Arbitration Court had been dissolved and that judicial matters previously under its authority had been transferred to the jurisdiction of the Supreme Court.

Amending the Constitution
The procedure for amending the Constitution is outlined in Chapter Nine. Proposals on amendments to and revision of the provisions of the Constitution of the Russian Federation may be submitted by the President of the Russian Federation, the Council of Federation, the State Duma, the Government of the Russian Federation, legislative (representative) bodies of constituent entities of the Russian Federation, and by groups consisting of not less than one fifth of the members of the Council of Federation or of the deputies of the State Duma. 

Article 137 covers updating the provisions of Article 65 of the Constitution of Russia. An update regarding the change of the name of the subject of the Russian Federation is carried out by a decree of the President of Russia on bringing the name of the subject of the Russian Federation in the text of the Constitution of the Russian Federation in accordance with the decision of the subject of the Russian Federation. An update regarding changes in the subject composition of the Russian Federation is carried out in accordance with the federal constitutional law on the admission to the Russian Federation and the formation of a new constituent entity of the Russian Federation, on changes in the constitutional and legal status of the constituent entities of the Russian Federation, which should contain an indication of the inclusion of relevant changes or additions to Article 65 of the Constitution of Russia.

Article 136 covers updating the provisions of chapters 3, 4, 5, 6, 7, and 8 of the Constitution of Russia. An update is carried out in the form of a special act: a law of the Russian Federation on amendments to the Constitution, which is adopted by the parliament similarly to the federal constitutional law, but then also requires ratification by the legislative bodies of the constituent entities of the Federation. Moreover, one law of the Russian Federation on the amendment to the Constitution covers interrelated changes to the constitutional text; the law itself receives a name reflecting the essence of this amendment.

Article 135 covers updating the provisions of chapters 1, 2, and 9 of the Constitution of Russia. An update to any of these chapters is considered a revision of the Constitution's fundamental provisions, which is possible only through the adoption of the new Constitution of the Russian Federation by the Russian Constitutional Assembly or by popular vote.

2008 amendments 

The amendments of 2008, which were proposed in November 2008 and came into force on 31 December 2008, are the first substantial amendments to the Constitution of Russia of 1993 and extended the terms of the President of Russia and the State Duma from four to six and five years, respectively. Earlier only minor adjustments concerning the naming of the federal subjects or their merging were made, which require a much simpler procedure.

February 2014 amendments

July 2014 amendments 

On 21 March 2014, Federal Constitutional Law No. 6 «On the Adoption of the Republic of Crimea into the Russian Federation and the Formation of New Subjects within the Russian Federation - the Republic of Crimea and the Federal City of Sevastopol» was adopted.

2020 amendments 

The amendments of 2020 remove the "in a row" clause from the article regulating the maximum number of presidential terms, discounting previous presidential terms before the amendment enters into force. Other changes are recognition of Russia as a successor to the Soviet Union in relation to international organizations, treaties, and assets of the USSR stipulated by international treaties outside the territory Russian Federation, banning ceding Russian territory, diminishing the accomplishments by the "defenders of the fatherland" and their role in World War II is no longer allowed, and enshrining God and heterosexual marriage in the constitution. Other amendments would enshrine the role of the Russian language as that of "state forming people", a constitutional reference to God and giving statutory backing to the State Council. 

From 25 June to 1 July 2020, a nationwide vote took place, with 78% of voters voting in favor of the amendments with a turnout of 65%, according to official results.

Putin signed an executive order on 3 July 2020 to officially insert the amendments into the Russian Constitution; they took effect on 4 July 2020.

2022 annexations 
After the signing of "treaties of annexation" with Russian occupation authorities during the 2022 invasion of Ukraine, the text of the constitution was updated to include the Donetsk People’s Republic, Kherson Oblast, Luhansk People’s Republic, and Zaporizhzhia Oblast. As of December 2022, none of these territories is fully controlled by Russian forces, and Russian law does not define their borders: Kremlin spokesperson Dmitry Peskov stated that Russia will "continue consultations with the residents" as to the oblast borders, and that the people’s republics are annexed "in the 2014 borders", but high-level Russian collaborator Oleg Tsariov stated that "there are no 2014 borders".

See also

Former constitutions 

 October Manifesto (1905)
 Russian Constitution of 1906
 Decree on the system of government of Russia (1918)
 Soviet Russia Constitution of 1918
 Act on the establishment of the All-Russian supreme power (1918)
 1924 Constitution of the Soviet Union
 Russian Constitution of 1925
 1936 Constitution of the Soviet Union
 Russian Constitution of 1937
 1977 Constitution of the Soviet Union
 Russian Constitution of 1978

Others 

 2008 amendments to the Constitution of Russia
 2020 amendments to the Constitution of Russia
 Constitution of the Soviet Union
 Constitutional economics
 Constitutionalism
 Impeachment in Russia
 Institute of State and Law
 Law of the Russian Federation
 Term limits in Russia
 Human rights in Russia

Notes

References

Partlett, William.  The Dangers of Popular Constitution-Making, Brooklyn Journal of International Law, Volume 38, 193-238 (2012). Available at https://ssrn.com/abstract=1924958.

Partlett, William. Crown-Presidentialism. International Journal of Constitutional Law (2022). Available at https://academic.oup.com/icon/advance-article/doi/10.1093/icon/moac006/6569412?login=true.

External links

 Text of the Russian constitution translated in English, does not include 2020 amendment, on Constituteproject.org
 Text of the Russian constitution in Russian
 Text of the Russian constitution translated in English - archived from an official website of the Government of the Russian Federation
 The Russian Constitution, with the Russian text and unofficial translations to English, German, and French
 Amendments to the Russian Constitution
 Information about the Russian Constitution
 Information about the Russian Constitution
 Manuel b.Garcia Alvarez Only foreign expert 

1993
1993 in law
1993 in Russia
Government of Russia
History of Russia (1991–present)
December 1993 events in Russia